In enzymology, a 2-oxo-acid reductase is an enzyme that catalyzes the chemical reaction

a (2R)-hydroxy-carboxylate + acceptor  a 2-oxo-carboxylate + reduced acceptor

Thus, the two substrates of this enzyme are (2R)-hydroxy-carboxylate and acceptor, whereas its two products are 2-oxo-carboxylate and reduced acceptor.

This enzyme belongs to the family of oxidoreductases, specifically those acting on the CH-OH group of donor with other acceptors.  The systematic name of this enzyme class is (2R)-hydroxy-carboxylate:acceptor oxidoreductase. Other names in common use include (2R)-hydroxycarboxylate-viologen-oxidoreductase, HVOR, and 2-oxoacid reductase.

References

 
 

EC 1.1.99
Enzymes of unknown structure